Fetim Kasapi (born 19 May 1983) is an Albanian football midfielder.

Club career
Born in Peć Serbia, he started playing in the local club KF Besa in 2000. During the winter break of the 2007–08 season, he signed with Montenegrin First League side FK Budućnost Podgorica which won the double that season. In summer 2008, he moved to FK Otrant which at that time was playing in the Montenegrin Second League. In summer 2009 he moved to Albanian Superliga side KS Vllaznia Shkodër, and he played for them in 2009–10 UEFA Europa League.

After his time in Albania, he played for Montenegrin side FK Mornar and he subsequently joined FK Čelik Nikšić in the Montenegrin First League.

After a spell with Swedish side Råslätts, he returned to Kosovo in November 2014 to rejoin hometown club Besa Peje.

Honours
Budućnost Podgorica
Montenegrin First League: 2007–08
Montenegrin Cup: 2007–08

Čelik Nikšić
Montenegrin Cup: 2011–12
Montenegrin Second League: 2011–12

References

External sources
 Stats from Montenegro at FSCG.co.me

1983 births
Living people
Sportspeople from Peja
Kosovan footballers
Association football midfielders
KF Besa players
FK Budućnost Podgorica players
KF Vllaznia Shkodër players
FK Mornar players
FK Jedinstvo Bijelo Polje players
FK Čelik Nikšić players
KF Trepça'89 players
FK Dečić players
Kosovan expatriate footballers
Expatriate footballers in Montenegro
Kosovan expatriate sportspeople in Montenegro
Expatriate footballers in Albania
Kosovan expatriate sportspeople in Albania
Expatriate footballers in Sweden
Kosovan expatriate sportspeople in Sweden